Devid de Santana Silva (born 28 March 1996), known as  Devid, is a Brazilian professional footballer who plays as a centre-forward for Malaysia Super League club Kelantan United.

Honours

Club 
Tirana
Kategoria Superiore: 2021–22

References

External links

1996 births
Living people
People from Alagoinhas
Brazilian footballers
Association football forwards
Catuense Futebol players
Avaí FC players
Clube Atlético Metropolitano players
Londrina Esporte Clube players
Foz do Iguaçu Futebol Clube players
KS Kastrioti players
S.C. Covilhã players
Campeonato Catarinense players
Campeonato Paranaense players
Campeonato Brasileiro Série D players
Kategoria Superiore players
Liga Portugal 2 players
Brazilian expatriate footballers
Expatriate footballers in Albania
Brazilian expatriate sportspeople in Albania
Expatriate footballers in Portugal
Brazilian expatriate sportspeople in Portugal
Sportspeople from Bahia